Jisr ash-Shugur District is a district of the Idlib Governorate in northwestern Syria. Administrative centre is the city of Jisr ash-Shugur. At the 2004 census, the district had a population of 150,193.

Sub-districts
The district of Jisr ash-Shugur is divided into four sub-districts or nawāḥī (population as of 2004):
Jisr al-Shughur Subdistrict (ناحية جسر الشغور): population 89,028.
Bidama Subdistrict (ناحية بداما): population 18,501.
Darkush Subdistrict (ناحية دركوش): population 23,022.
Al-Janudiyah Subdistrict (ناحية الجانودية): population 19,642.

References

External links